Viorel Frunză (born 6 December 1979) is a Moldovan football coach and a former striker.

International goals
Scores and results list Moldova's goal tally first.

Honours
 Zimbru Chişinău
 Moldovan Cup: 2002–03, 2003–04
 Shakhter Karagandy
 Kazakhstan Premier League: 2011
 FC Veris
 Moldovan Third Division: 2011–12
 Moldovan Second Division: 2012–13

References

External links

1979 births
Living people
Footballers from Chișinău
Moldovan footballers
Moldova international footballers
Association football forwards
Moldovan Super Liga players
FC Zimbru Chișinău players
FC Dacia Chișinău players
FC Veris Chișinău players
Liga I players
FC Vaslui players
CFR Cluj players
CSM Ceahlăul Piatra Neamț players
FC Politehnica Iași (1945) players
Super League Greece players
PAOK FC players
Russian Premier League players
PFC Spartak Nalchik players
Kazakhstan Premier League players
FC Atyrau players
FC Shakhter Karagandy players
Belarusian Premier League players
FC Neman Grodno players
Moldovan expatriate footballers
Moldovan expatriate sportspeople in Romania
Expatriate footballers in Romania
Moldovan expatriate sportspeople in Greece
Expatriate footballers in Greece
Moldovan expatriate sportspeople in Kazakhstan
Expatriate footballers in Kazakhstan
Moldovan expatriate sportspeople in Russia
Expatriate footballers in Russia
Moldovan expatriate sportspeople in Belarus
Expatriate footballers in Belarus
Moldovan football managers
FC Academia Chișinău managers
FC Dacia Chișinău managers
FC Dinamo-Auto Tiraspol managers
CS Știința Miroslava managers
Moldovan expatriate football managers
Expatriate football managers in Romania
Expatriate football managers in Latvia
Moldovan expatriate sportspeople in Latvia
FK Ventspils managers
Moldovan Super Liga managers